Hagadone is a surname. Notable people with the surname include:

Duane Hagadone (1932–2021), American businessman and philanthropist
Nick Hagadone (born 1986), American baseball player